Yoshihiro Nikawadori (荷川取義浩, Nikawadori Yoshihiro, born 4 December 1961) is a Japanese former handball player who competed in the 1988 Summer Olympics.

References

1961 births
Living people
Japanese male handball players
Olympic handball players of Japan
Handball players at the 1988 Summer Olympics
Chubu University alumni